Union Cognac Saint-Jean-d'Angély is a French rugby union club from Cognac, Charente & Saint-Jean-d'Angély, Charente-Maritime that play in the Nationale, third tier of the French league system.

Current standings

References

External links
Official website

Rugby clubs established in 2017
Union Cognac Saint-Jean-d'Angély
Sport in Charente
Sport in Charente-Maritime